Kamiyugi Park Baseball Field, also known as Kamiyugi Baseball Stadium, (上柚木公園野球場) is a baseball field located in Hachioji, Tokyo, Japan.

Overview
It opened in October 2000.  Both sides are 98 meters in length and the longest sides measure 122 meters. The infield area has a clay surface while the outfield is a natural lawn. There is a magnetic reversal type of scoreboard. It has a capacity of 3,000 people (1,600 in the inner section, 1,400 in the outer section)

Transport
The baseball field is a walk of about 20 minutes from Minami-ōsawa Station on the Keio Sagamihara Line or it can be reached by bus from the South Exit of Hachioji Station operated by East Japan Railway Company (JR East).

See also
 Baseball in Japan

External links
  Website of Ballpark Trips from the Far East
  Website of Hachioji City (in Japanese)

Sports venues in Tokyo
Hachiōji, Tokyo
Baseball in Japan